Charles Jacquin et Cie, Inc. (Jacquin's) is a producer, distiller, rectifier, manufacturer, and importer of alcoholic beverages and food products. It is a wholly owned subsidiary of Chatam International Incorporated, and is based in Philadelphia, Pennsylvania. The company was founded in 1884 by Charles Jacquin, a Frenchman who emigrated to Philadelphia. It claims to be the oldest producer of cordials in the United States and the only cordial producer in Pennsylvania. 

In addition to products made at its facilities in Philadelphia, Jacquin's imports from distilleries and ingredient sources it owns in France, China and Poland. Jacquin's is the owner, distiller and importer of Pravda Vodka, which is distilled in Poland. It is also the manufacturer and importer of St Dalfour Gourmet French brand foods, teas, fine jellies and jams. Its products are exported to major countries throughout the world via intermediaries and agents.

References 

Food and drink companies established in 1884
Distilleries in Pennsylvania
Privately held companies based in Pennsylvania
1884 establishments in Pennsylvania